Declan 'Fabio' O'Brien (born 16 June 1979) is an Irish former professional footballer who played as a striker. He is Drogheda United's top goalscorer of all time.

Playing career

Drogheda United
O'Brien started his professional career with Drogheda United scoring on his League of Ireland debut at Cobh Ramblers on the opening day of the 2001–02 League of Ireland. He was the club captain and talisman and he captained the club to one FAI Cup in 2005 , a game where he scored, two Setanta Cups and the club's only ever title win in 2007. Fabio is the club's all-time leading goalscorer with 90 goals in 184 games, 76 in domestic league and the rest in domestic cups (Setanta Sports Cup, FAI Cup and League of Ireland Cup) from his first spell at Hunky Dorys Park.

Dundalk
On 15 January 2009, O'Brien made the controversial move across Louth to Drogheda United's local rivals Dundalk who had just been promoted to the League of Ireland Premier Division. He played out of position as a left winger and left in the transfer window in July. He managed 4 goals in 15 appearances.

St Patrick's Athletic
He signed for St Patrick's Athletic in July for the rest of the 2009 season on loan . He scored on his debut in the Europa League against Valletta and repeated the trick in the second leg  to send St Patrick's Athletic into the next round.

O'Brien then scored in both rounds again against FC Krylia Sovetov Samara to become St Patrick's Athletic all-time record scorer in European competition at the time. He was Player of the Month for July 2009.

He finished the season as joint top scorer with St Patricks despite being there for just four months.

Valletta
In December 2009, O'Brien joined Maltese football club Valletta (the same team that he helped eliminate in the Europa League qualifiers) on a free transfer, after his loan contract with St Patrick's Athletic expired the previous month. O'Brien holds the Irish record for consecutive goals in European ties (4).

In his debut with Valletta (in a Triangular tournament against Parma and Hibernians), Declan managed to score with a low flying header against Serie A's side Parma F.C.

On 15 February 2010 making his 6th league appearance for Valletta, O'Brien scored his first league goals in a 6–0 victory over Dingli Swallows. O'Brien scored 4 goals in the match.

Then on 27 February, on his 7th league appearance Declan managed to score 2 goals in just 15 mins when he was substitute in the 75th minute against Tarxien Rainbows with the score finishing 6–2 for Valletta. He followed this up with another brace in the Gozo cup against Gozo a week later. He also scored 2 weeks later in the U*BET F.A Trophy Cup against Birkarkara in a 3–1 win.

He won his first piece of silverware with Valletta F.C., when winning the 100th League Anniversary Cup against bitter rivals Floriana on 13 April 2010. He we talked on to win the FA trophy that season also but lost out on the treble finishing second in the league . He agreed to leave with early from his contract that summer .

Athlone Town
In July 2010 he signed for Athlone Town as a player-coach and made his debut in a 1–1 draw against Middlesbrough F.C.

He scored his first goal for Athlone at the Brandywell on 10 September.

Monaghan United
He signed for Monaghan United in December 2010 on a two-year deal. He scored two on his debut against Cork City in 2–2 draw at Turners Cross on 1 April. He then scored the winning goal on his home debut v Longford Town in a 1–0 win the following week.

O'Brien hit his first hat trick for Monaghan in the third round of the FAI Cup v Everton A.F.C.

In his last game for Monaghan he helped secure promotion by scoring a brace against Galway United in November 2011.

Return to Drogheda
For the 2012 season O'Brien returned to Drogheda United. He scored his first goal on his return at Bray.

O'Brien scored his 100th League of Ireland goal at Tallaght Stadium in May 2012 .

He scored the opener in the 2012 League of Ireland Cup Final against Shamrock Rovers at Tallaght Stadium. The Drogs won 3–1 which completed Fabio's set of medals in the domestic game having won the League title, FAI Cup and the Setanta Sports Cup (twice) in his previous stint at the club. To add gloss to the victory, he was also awarded 'Man of the Match'. 

Fabio was in the MNS Team of the Year 2012, along with Drogheda teammate Gabriel Sava. He scored 18 goals in all competitions for Drogheda to become the first Drogheda player to score more than 100 goals for the club. On 22 November 2012, Fabio signed a one-year deal with the Drogs to keep him at United Park until the end of the 2013 season.

As of August 2022, O'Brien is 22nd in the all-time League of Ireland goalscoring list with 128 league goals.

Glenavon
On the opening of the January 2015 transfer window, O'Brien joined NIFL Premiership side and current Irish Cup holders Glenavon on an 18-month deal. O'Brien scored a debut hattrick in a 4-2 win over Ballymena United.

Carrick Rangers
The Irish attacker signed a 2-year deal with the 'Amber Army' in late January 2017 from Glenavon. Fabio scored on his Carrick Rangers debut against Ards in a 4-0 win away from home, the club's biggest margin of victory for 3 years. He has already picked up 3 assists in his time at Taylor's Avenue. The former Valletta man then had an unfortunate goal drought of 8 games, however he certainly made up for it when he scored a brace in the 2nd leg of the promotion/relegation playoff final, the first a sensational solo goal and a beautiful panenka penalty to cap off an incredible 4-1 victory for the 'Gers over championship runners-up Institute, sealing a 5-2 aggregate win to stay in the premiership.

Verona
On 23 June 2017, it was announced that O'Brien had left Carrick to become player-manager of Leinster Senior League side Verona FC.

Honours
 League of Ireland:
 Drogheda United – 2007
 FAI Cup:
 Drogheda United – 2005
 Setanta Cup:
 Drogheda United – 2006, 2007
 League of Ireland Cup:
 Drogheda United – 2012
 League of Ireland First Division:
 Drogheda United – 2001–02
 Maltese Cup:
 Valletta F.C. – 2010
 100th League Anniversary Cup
 Valletta F.C. – 2010
 Irish Cup:
 Glenavon – 2015–16

References 

1979 births
Living people
Association footballers from County Dublin
Republic of Ireland association footballers
Association football forwards
League of Ireland players
Drogheda United F.C. players
Dundalk F.C. players
St Patrick's Athletic F.C. players
Athlone Town A.F.C. players
Monaghan United F.C. players
Valletta F.C. players
Rivermount Boys F.C. players
Carrick Rangers F.C. players